George Philip Hoy is a former Democratic member of the Indiana House of Representatives, he represented the 77th District from 2004 to 2008.

Birth
Phil Hoy was born in Indianapolis, IN on February 5, 1937.

Religion
Phil Hoy practices in the religion of the United Church of Christ.

Education
Phil Hoy received his M.Div. by graduating Southern Baptist Theological Seminary in the year of 1962, and he also received his BA in History and Political Science at Kentucky Wesleyan College in the year of 1958.

Family
Hoy is married to Sandra Hoy, and he also has six children.

Professional Experience
Interim Pastor, Zion United Church of Christ, Henderson, KY, 2003–present
Executive Director, Tri-State Food Bank, 1987-2000
Pastor, St. Peter's United Church of Christ, Evansville, 1987-?
Pastor, St. Matthew's United Church of Christ, Evansville, 1981-1987
Pastor, Faith United Church of Christ, Fort Wayne, 1975-1980
Founding Director, Metropolitan Evansville Youth Service Bureau, 1972-1975
Instructor, Brescia College, Owensboro, KY, 1972-1973
Chaplain, Evansville State Hospital, 1967-1972
Pastor, Union United Church of Christ, Evansville, 1962-1972

External links
Indiana State Legislature - Representative Phil Hoy Official government website
Project Vote Smart - Representative George Philip 'Phil' Hoy (IN) profile
Follow the Money - Phil Hoy
2006 2004 campaign contributions

References

Democratic Party members of the Indiana House of Representatives
1937 births
Living people
Politicians from Indianapolis
Politicians from Evansville, Indiana
United Church of Christ ministers